Jon Pearn is an English house music producer and a member of several successful acts including Araknofobia,  Full Intention and Bodyrox.

Biography 
Pearn, with production partner Nick Bridges formed Bodyrox. Their track "Yeah Yeah" was a hit in 2006 with the help of Luciana. "Yeah Yeah" went on to chart at number 2 in the UK Top 40 and was subsequently nominated for two International Dance Music awards, an MTV video award and the prestigious Ivor Novello awards in 2007.

Working alongside Michael Gray as Full Intention, the duo has produced songs such as "America (I Love America)", "Once in a Lifetime" and "I Can Cast a Spell". Moreover, the duo provided remixes for artists including Jamiroquai, Supafly, Mariah Carey, Masters at Work, Emma Bunton and Ultra Nate. Full Intention were also nominated for a Grammy Award for their remix of "Amazing" by George Michael in 2004.

In the 2010s, Pearn released numerous tracks with Full Intention. In May 2019, he collaborated with PowerDress and Arthur Baker on a track called "Constellations".

References

External links
 Full Intention official site
 BodyRox official site

Living people
English record producers
English dance musicians
English house musicians
Club DJs
English DJs
Year of birth missing (living people)
Electronic dance music DJs
People educated at Whitgift School